The 2000 Regal Welsh Open was a professional ranking snooker tournament that took place between 24 and 30 January 2000 at the Cardiff International Arena in Cardiff, Wales.

Mark Williams was the defending champion, but he lost his last 16 match against Matthew Stevens.

John Higgins defeated Stephen Lee 9–8 in the final to win his 13th ranking title.

Tournament summary

Defending champion Mark Williams was the number 1 seed with World Champion Stephen Hendry seeded 2. The remaining places were allocated to players based on the world rankings.

Main draw

Final

Century breaks

References

Welsh Open (snooker)
2000 in snooker
2000s in Cardiff
Welsh